In number theory, the  Chevalley–Warning theorem implies that certain polynomial equations in sufficiently many variables over a finite field have solutions. Chevalley's theorem implied Artin's and Dickson's conjecture that finite fields are quasi-algebraically closed fields .

Statement of the theorems 

Let  be a finite field and  be a set of polynomials such that the number of variables satisfies

The theorems are statements about the solutions of the following system of polynomial equations

 The Chevalley theorem states that if the system has the trivial solution , that is, if the polynomials have no constant terms, then the system also has a non-trivial solution .

Chevalley's theorem is an immediate consequence of the Chevalley–Warning theorem since  is at least 2.

Both theorems are best possible in the sense that, given any , the list  has total degree  and only the trivial solution. Alternatively, using just one polynomial, we can take f1 to be the degree n polynomial given by the norm of x1a1 + ... + xnan where the elements a form a basis of the finite field of order pn.

Chevalley's theorem also follows directly from this.

Proof of Warning's theorem
Remark: If  then 

because each term is 1 for a solution and 0 otherwise.
If the sum of the degrees of the polynomials  is less than n then this vanishes by the remark above.

Artin's conjecture 

It is a consequence of Chevalley's theorem that finite fields are quasi-algebraically closed. This had been conjectured by Emil Artin in 1935. The motivation behind Artin's conjecture was his observation that quasi-algebraically closed fields have trivial Brauer group, together with the fact that finite fields have trivial Brauer group by Wedderburn's theorem.

The Ax–Katz theorem 

 

The Ax–Katz result has an interpretation in étale cohomology as a divisibility result for the (reciprocals of) the zeroes and poles of the local zeta-function. Namely, the same power of  divides each of these algebraic integers.

See also 
 Combinatorial Nullstellensatz

References

External links

Finite fields
Diophantine geometry
Theorems in algebra